Caldwell Parish Airport  is a public use airport in Caldwell Parish, Louisiana, United States. It is owned by the Caldwell Parish Police Jury and located two nautical miles (4 km) northeast of the central business district of Columbia, Louisiana. It was formerly known as Columbia Airport.

Facilities and aircraft 
Caldwell Parish Airport covers an area of 70 acres (28 ha) at an elevation of 67 feet (20 m) above mean sea level. It has one runway designated 1/19 with an asphalt surface measuring 3,501 by 75 feet (1,067 x 23 m).

For the 12-month period ending October 27, 2011, the airport had 13,750 general aviation aircraft operations, an average of 37 per day. At that time there were 12 aircraft based at this airport: 92% single-engine and 8% helicopter.

See also 
 List of airports in Louisiana

References

External links 
 Columbia Airport (F86) at LaDOTD airport directory
 Aerial image as of February 1998 from USGS The National Map
 

Airports in Louisiana
Transportation in Caldwell Parish, Louisiana
Buildings and structures in Caldwell Parish, Louisiana